Yevgeny Aleksandrovich Salakhov (born 25 January 1979) is a Russian former sprint canoer. Competing in the K-1 4×200 m event he won a silver medal at the 2011 and a bronze at the 2010 ICF Canoe Sprint World Championships.

Salakhov also participated in the 2000, 2008 and 2012 Olympics, with the best result of fifth place in 2012. His mother is a former canoe coach. Salakhov is married to Yulia Salakhova (née Kamalova, unrelated to the Olympic canoer Yuliana Salakhova). They have a daughter Eva, and work as canoe coaches in Sysert.

References

1979 births
Canoeists at the 2000 Summer Olympics
Canoeists at the 2008 Summer Olympics
Canoeists at the 2012 Summer Olympics
Living people
Olympic canoeists of Russia
Russian male canoeists
ICF Canoe Sprint World Championships medalists in kayak